Westbeach is a British television series produced by Witzend Productions for the BBC in 1993.

The series was set in the fictional seaside town of Westbeach (filmed on location in Eastbourne) and dealt with two rival families, the Cromers and the Prestons, who controlled the local businesses. The Preston family owned an upmarket seafront hotel, while the Cromers ran an amusement arcade and a fish-and-chip shop. One series of ten episodes was produced.

The Times described the "dismal performance" of the BBC's three new flagships dramas which included Westbeach, the programme only achieved 6.27 million viewers and was ranked 69th.

Cast

 Oliver Cotton – Alan Cromer
 Deborah Grant – Sarah Preston
 Michael Attwell – Ray Cromer
 Debby Bishop – Yola Cromer
 Lesley Duff – Maggie Cromer
 David Horovitch – Hugo Preston
 Annie Lambert – Alex Preston
 Imogen Boorman – Hannah Preston
 Tony Caunter – Bill Cromer

 Lee Ross – Chris Cromer
 Ricco Ross – Greg Dacosta
 Edna Doré – Iris Cromer
 Jo Warne – Betty Cromer
 Cherith Mellor – Jean Cromer
 Ben Porter – Simon Cromer
 Siobhan Burke – Jan Cromer
 Pat Keen – Florrie Dawson
 Alison Lomas – Angela

Episodes

References

External links

Television series by Fremantle (company)
BBC television dramas
1993 British television series debuts
1993 British television series endings
1990s British drama television series
1990s British television miniseries
English-language television shows
Television shows set in Sussex